Charles Towry Hamilton Towry-Law, 4th Baron Ellenborough (21 April 1856 – 26 June 1902), was a member of the House of Lords.

He was the only child of Charles Towry-Law, 3rd Baron Ellenborough, and his second wife, Anne Elizabeth Fitzgerald-Day. His parents were married at Lymington on 28 June 1855, and he was born on 21 April 1856. His mother, who was the granddaughter of Mr Justice Robert Day MP and daughter of Rev. John Robert Fitzgerald-Day of Beaufort, County Kerry, and Lucy Thompson, died suddenly in February 1860 on a ship returning from India.

Charles succeeded his father as 4th Baron Ellenborough in 1890 and died of cardiac failure unmarried at 152 Harley Street, London, on 26 June 1902. He was in turn succeeded by a cousin, Edward Law, 5th Baron Ellenborough.

Ancestry

References

1856 births
1902 deaths
Members of the British House of Lords
Charles 4
Eldest sons of British hereditary barons